Juraj (Giorgio) Dobrila (16 March 1812 – 13 January 1882) was a Catholic bishop and benefactor from Istria who advocated for greater national rights for Croats and also Slovenes in Istria under Austrian rule.

Biography
Dobrila was born in the village of Veli Ježenj (now part of Pazin), Tinjanština (Antignana) region of middle Istria, which was then and for a brief period part of Napoleon's Illyrian provinces and shortly thereafter the Habsburg monarchy (today part of Croatia). His above-average intelligence let him engage a German elementary school in Tinjan and Pazin, then a gymnasium in Gorizia, and Karlovac where he also attended a seminary. He became a priest in 1837 and took duty 1837 - 1838 in Munama and Hrusici. From 1839 he studied theology at Augustineum in Vienna and finished in 1842. After his studies, he became a chaplain in Trieste, a German enlighter and a principal of a girl-school. From 1857 to 1875 he was the bishop of the Roman Catholic Diocese of Parenzo e Pola - Poreč i Pula region and from 1875 until his death he was the bishop of the Roman Catholic Diocese of Trieste e Capodistria - Trst in Koper region.

Dobrila studied with and was a friend of Josip Juraj Strossmayer, another Croatian bishop and benefactor of the 19th century. He was a vocal supporter of the Croat and Slovene population in Istria, which was the majority there, but culturally and politically dominated by Italians from the coastal towns.

During the Revolutions of 1848, Dobrila became a member of the Slavjansko društvo ("Slavic society") in Trieste. He supported the introduction of the Slavic languages into schools and public life, funded children who wanted to attend schools in the Croatian part of the monarchy (in Rijeka and Kastav) and encouraged the peasants in Istria, mostly composed of Slavic people, to read books in their native language and avoid being abused by their mostly Italian lords.

Dobrila printed the prayer book Oče, budi volja tvoja in Croatian in 1854, and supported the publishing of the first Croatian newspaper in Istria Naša sloga in 1870. He also published a collection of folk tales and proverbs Različno cvijeće. His second prayer book Mladi Bogoljub was published in 1889.

He was a member of the Regional Council of Poreč since its founding in 1861 and the representative of the council in the Parliament in Vienna until 1867. He was also a participant of the First Vatican Council (1870) where he supported bishop Strossmayer's views on the future of the Church.

Dobrila donated his whole estate to charity post mortem. Dobrila's portrait was depicted on the obverse of the Croatian 10 kuna banknote, issued in 1993, 1995, 2001 and 2004. Two high schools are named after Dobrila, one in Pazin and one in Pula.
The University of Pula is called in his honour Juraj Dobrila University of Pula.

References

External links
 Juraj (Giorgio) Dobrila by istrianet.org
 Juraj Dobrila at the "Juraj Dobrila gymnasium and vocational school", Pazin

1812 births
1882 deaths
People from Pazin
People from Istria
Roman Catholic bishops in the Austrian Empire
Members of the Austrian House of Deputies (1861–1867)
People of the Illyrian movement
Higher Scientific Institute for Diocesan Priests at St. Augustine's alumni